Conciliation bills were proposed legislation which would extend the right of women to vote in the United Kingdom of Great Britain and Ireland to just over a million wealthy, property-owning women. After the January 1910 election, an all-party Conciliation party, consisting of 36 members of parliament and chaired by Lord Lytton, proposed the new Parliamentary Franchise (Women) Bill. Three Conciliation bills were put before the House of Commons, one each year in 1910, 1911 and in 1912, but all failed.

While the Liberal government of H. H. Asquith supported this, a number of backbenchers, both Conservative and Liberal, did not, fearing that it would damage their parties’ success in general elections. Some pro-suffrage groups rejected the Bills because they only gave the vote to propertied women; some Members of Parliament rejected them because they did not want any women to have the right to vote. Liberals also opposed the Bill because they believed that the women whom the bill would enfranchise were more likely to vote Conservative than Liberal.

Conciliation Bill 1910
Prime Minister Asquith agreed to give the bill parliamentary time after pressure from the Cabinet. The Bill passed its first reading. It passed a second reading with 320 for the notion and 175 against on 12 July.  However Asquith called a general election on the 18th November 1910, meaning further parliamentary process could not take place. The Women's Social and Political Union saw this as a betrayal, and their protest march became known as Black Friday (1910).

Conciliation Bill 1911
The Second Conciliation Bill was debated on 5 May 1911 and won a majority of 255 to 88 as a Private Members Bill. The bill was promised a week of government time. However, in November Asquith announced that he was in favour of a manhood suffrage bill and that suffragists could suggest and propose an amendment that would allow some women to vote. The bill was consequently dropped.

Conciliation Bill 1912
The Parliamentary Franchise (Women) Bill was again introduced on 19 February 1912 and set down for Second Reading on 22 March, although the debate was later delayed to 29 March. However this time the Bill was defeated by 208 to 222. The reason for the defeat was that the Irish Parliamentary Party believed that a debate over votes for women would be used to prevent Irish home rule. However the Women's Social and Political Union blamed Asquith, as the eight members of the Government who had voted against the Bill would have overturned the result had they voted the other way.

The Franchise Bill, for universal manhood suffrage, was introduced in 1912 but was strongly criticised, and made no progress.

See also
 Representation of the People Act 1918 - included partial enfranchisement of UK women
 Representation of the People (Equal Franchise) Act 1928 - included full enfranchisement of UK women

References

External links
Extracts from MPs who debated the passage of the Bill

1910 in British law
Proposed laws of the United Kingdom
Women's suffrage in the United Kingdom
1911 in British law
1912 in British law
1910 in women's history
1911 in women's history
1912 in women's history
H. H. Asquith